Milkeh-ye Buchan (also Romanized as Mīlkeh-ye Būchān; also known as Mīlekeh, Mīlekeh-ye Pūchān, Mīlgeh-e Būchān, Mīlkeh-ye Pūchān, Millehgāh, and Milleh Gāwāna) is a village in Haft Ashiyan Rural District, Kuzaran District, Kermanshah County, Kermanshah Province, Iran. At the 2006 census, its population was 113, in 29 families.

References 

Populated places in Kermanshah County